St Nicholas Church is in the seaside town of Fleetwood, Lancashire, England, situated on the Fylde coast. It is an active Anglican church in the Diocese of Blackburn. It was constructed between 1960 and 1962, and designed by Laurence King.

History
The church is the third in the town bearing the name of St Nicholas, and the second built on the present site. The first, on Wyre Street, was destroyed in the floods of 1927, and the second was demolished in the late 1950s to make way for the current building. Part of it survived until 2007 as the scout hut. The church was designed by Laurence King (1907-1981), a prominent Lancashire ecclesiastical architect, who also designed the tower of Blackburn Cathedral. The foundation stone was laid by Nicholas Meynell in October 1960 and the site was hallowed by Charles Claxton, Bishop of Blackburn. Although never fully completed, the church was dedicated by Anthony Hoskyns-Abrahall, Bishop of Lancaster, in April 1962. The building was not consecrated until 1987 when the church became the parish church of the new parish of St Nicholas, Fleetwood.

Architecture
St Nicholas stands on a triangular plot of land at the intersection of Poulton Road, Highbury Avenue and Broadway. Whilst modern in appearance, it is traditional in form, comprising a central tower, nave, chancel, north and south porches, and ancillary rooms. King's design was intended to resemble the upturned keel of a ship, reflecting the seafaring aspects both of the town and of St Nicholas himself. 
 
The external construction of the church is largely of light brown brick. There is no stone or concrete used anywhere. The other prominent external feature is the series of steeply-pitched copper roofs, whose green patina contrasts with the orange-brown brickwork. The large square central tower is composed of two, tall tapering brick slabs on the east and west faces, and flat recessed plain-glass windows on the north and south faces. The nave and chancel roofs are very steeply pitched, but the nave roof is considerably higher, extending over the aisles. Each of the roofs has three sharply pitched dormers on each side, those on the chancel being smaller than those on the nave. The overall effect is intended to be reminiscent of the sails of a ship.

While the exterior is sharply angular, the interior is dominated by pointed arches. Construction is of the same light-brown brick as the exterior, although contrasted with pale pointing. Centrally placed on the west wall is the organ (1961). The instrument is a 2 manual and pedal pipe organ, probably the last to be built by the firm of J J Binns.  It is a 5 rank extension organ, with 4 ranks totally enclosed in a swell box and the 5th rank, a diapason, on display to the side and above the console. ,  The high altar, under the tower, is raised on a two-step plinth. Beyond the high altar, in the chancel, is the Lady Chapel, with an abstract stained glass window; the only stained glass in the church. Laurence King designed the three large painted wood carvings prominent in the interior: a Madonna and a St Nicholas on either side of the chancel arch and a Crucifix in the chancel.

Sources
Open Churches Trust. Fleetwood, St Nicholas
Lancashire Churches. Fleetwood, St Nicholas
St Nicholas Parish Church Official website

Saint Nicholas
Church of England church buildings in Lancashire
Diocese of Blackburn